Smith Township is a township in Dade County, in the U.S. state of Missouri.

Smith Township was named after Asa Smith, an early settler.

References

Townships in Missouri
Townships in Dade County, Missouri